The Lago Puelo National Park is a national park of Argentina, located in the northwest of the province of Chubut, in the Patagonia region of South America. It was created to protect its scenic landscape and the Valdivian flora to augment that of the nearby Los Alerces National Park. Originally an annex to Los Alerces, it was declared a National Park and independent reserve in 1971.

The protected area is named after the Puelo Lake, and belongs to the Patagonic forest and steppes and High Andes eco-regions.

The mountainous zone where the park lies was modified by the action of glaciers, which created many rivers and lakes, including Puelo Lake the namesake of the park. The rivers of the region have high levels of glacier sediment (silt), which gives Puelo Lake its blue color.

Climate
The climate is cold and wet, although more temperate than other parks in the Patagonian region. Occasionally, snowfall can occur during the coldest months.

Flora and fauna

Some of the flora of the park belongs to the Valdivian rain forests (avellano, tique, lingue, ulmo). It also includes the ciprés de la cordillera, the coihue, the lenga, the radal, and the arrayán. The rosa mosqueta is an exotic plant.

The fauna includes the pudú, the huemul, the red fox, the cougar, and the coipo. Among birds we find the huala, the pato vapor volador, the bandurria, the pitío and the zorzal patagónico. The lake features native fish such as the perca, the peladilla and the puyén grande, and foreign species of trout.

History
The first settlers of the region were hunter-gatherers who lived in the steppe and employed stone tools to hunt guanacos. There are cave paintings within the park, apparently showing representations of paths into the forest. Nowadays Mapuche communities live in the eastern part of the park.

References

Sources
Administración de Parques Nacionales — National Parks Administration of Argentina (in Spanish and English)

Protected areas of Chubut Province
National parks of Argentina
Protected areas established in 1971
Biosphere reserves of Argentina
Valdivian temperate rainforest